Tayfun Cora (born 5 December 1983 in Vakfıkebir) is a retired Turkish footballer.

Career
Tayfun plays for Trabzonspor, where he promoted from youth team. He made the step up to the first team in his teenage years, and is also a regular in the Turkish under-21 team. Although he was not established in the Trabzonspor team, he still made regular appearances. He is usually used as a central defender or a right back.  He was loaned to Kayserispor for a year and he is back with the Trabzonspor.

Honours

Club
Trabzonspor
Turkish Cup: 2002–03, 2003–04

References

1983 births
Living people
People from Vakfıkebir
Turkish footballers
Turkey under-21 international footballers
Trabzonspor footballers
Kayserispor footballers
Süper Lig players
Association football fullbacks
Turkey youth international footballers
Association football defenders